Fábio Igel (born 14 August 1970) is a Brazilian alpine skier. He competed in the men's giant slalom at the 1992 Winter Olympics.

References

1970 births
Living people
Brazilian male alpine skiers
Olympic alpine skiers of Brazil
Alpine skiers at the 1992 Winter Olympics
Place of birth missing (living people)